Samiollah Hosseini Makarem is an Iranian politician who served as the acting mayor of Tehran.

Acting Mayor of Tehran
Makarem was elected acting Mayor by the Islamic City Council of Tehran, with 14 out of 21 votes in favor, following Mohammad-Ali Najafi’s second resignation on April 10th. Najafi had attempted to resign in mid-March after a video of him watching a girls dancing ritual, which offended Iranian clerics, was exposed. However, he maintained his official reason for wanting to resign was due to health reasons.

References

Mayors of Tehran